Grave Declaration is a Christian black metal band that originated in Norway. The band formed in September 2006 as a solo project of Thor Georg Buer, formerly of Antestor. He later on hired other musicians including his former Antestor band mates, Ronny Hansen and Jo Henning Børven.

Discography
Studio albums
When Dying Souls Scream Praise (2013)

EPs
 The Nightshift Worshiper (2008)

References

External links

Musical groups established in 2006
Norwegian Christian metal musical groups